Coronidium monticola, commonly known as the mountain coronidium, is a flowering plant in the family Asteraceae and grows in open forests in eastern Australia. It has woolly, grey-green leaves and mostly yellow flowers.

Description
The leaf upper surface is smooth with sparse or thickly woolly and lower surface similar with several glands and edges recurved.

Taxonomy and naming
Coronidium monticola was first formally described in 2014 by Neville Grant Walsh and the description was published in Muelleria.The specific epithet (monticola) means "mountain dweller".

Distribution and habitat
Mountain coronidium grows at higher altitudes in montane forests, subalpine woodland and herb fields on soils that are rocky and usually well-drained in New South Wales, Victoria and the Australian Capital Territory.

References

monticola
Flora of New South Wales
Flora of Victoria (Australia)
Flora of the Australian Capital Territory
Flora of Tasmania
Asterales of Australia
Garden plants of Australia
Taxa named by Neville Grant Walsh